Egil Remi Jensen (born 6 November 1929) was a Norwegian newspaper editor.

He was born in Vennesla. He was hired as a subeditor in the newspaper Fædrelandsvennen in 1957, and was the chief editor there from 1979 to 1995. He chaired the Norwegian Press Association from 1987 to 1989. He has also been a board member of the newspaper Agder.

References

1929 births
Living people
Norwegian newspaper editors
People from Vest-Agder
People from Vennesla